DZGE (855 AM) Radyo Numero Uno is a radio station owned and operated by Filipinas Broadcasting Network. The station's studio and transmitter are located at Brgy. Baras, Canaman. It is the pioneer AM station in the province.

References

Radio stations established in 1960
Radio stations in Naga, Camarines Sur
News and talk radio stations in the Philippines